Festucopsis is a genus of European plants in the grass family.

 Species
 Festucopsis festucoides (Maire) Löve - Morocco, inclusion in the genus uncertain
 Festucopsis serpentini (C.E.Hubb.) Melderis - Albania

 formerly included
 Festucopsis sancta (Janka) Melderis - Peridictyon sanctum, southern Bulgaria, northern Greece

See also
 List of Poaceae genera

References

Pooideae
Poaceae genera
Taxa named by Charles Edward Hubbard